The Aero Ae270 Spirit was a single-engine turboprop general utility aircraft that was developed by the Czech aircraft company Aero Vodochody. A prototype made its maiden flight in 2000, with European Aviation Safety Agency (EASA) Type Certification in 2005 and Federal Aviation Administration (FAA) type certification in 2006. No production followed.

History

Prototype 

Design began in the early 1990s. The aircraft's configuration was finalized by 1993. In 1997, Aero signed an agreement with AIDC of Taiwan to jointly manufacture and market the aircraft through Ibis Aerospace. The first prototype (0001, OK-EMA) was completed in 2000, and it first flew on July 25, 2000.

Five prototypes were planned, two for static and dynamic tests and three for flight tests. The requirements changed and the aircraft was redesigned for greater performance and capabilities, new equipment added, a new engine variant chosen. The second (partial) prototype was used for static tests and the fourth, for fatigue tests. The third prototype (OK-SAR) first flew in 2002. The fifth prototype (OK-LIB) was finished in 2003, with its first flight in February. The sixth prototype (OK-INA) was also finished in 2003. UCL (Czech Civil Aeronautical Institute) added more requirements, which delayed further tests. The first prototype was no longer usable for EASA test flights as changes were significant. A seventh prototype (OK-EVA) was built in 2004.

In 2004, AIDC announced that it would not deliver wings for additional airplanes. Aero Vodochody also had issues with money for certification and some members of upper management at Aero were against the program. Deteriorating flight parameters and Aero management interest led to cancellation of preliminary orders. Aero Vodochody was never able to calculate a production price, mostly because the wing was produced in Taiwan and alternate production in Czech Republic was never envisioned.

In 2004, AIDC announced that its business priorities had shifted from the civil to military aviation. At the same time, Aero Vodochody's upper management experienced a similar shift in their business priorities. Aero management's declining interest led to the cancellation of eighty advance orders for the Ae270 aircraft.

Certification 

Airworthiness was certified by the Czech Civil Aviation Authority permitting training and aerial work, including commencement of commercial use. EASA certification completed on December the 12th 2005. The FAA certificate was received on 24 February 2006.

Programme suspension 

During 2008 the project was suspended, jigs and tools removed and 3 unfinished fuselages (including fatigue test prototype 0004) were moved to the Air Park Zruč u Plzně museum. In July 2011, Aero Vodochody stated that the Ae-270 Ibis/Spirit program (including know-how, jigs and tools) would be sold to Belarus, where serial production was planned to start in 2015.

Aircraft Integrated Solutions, a British aviation engineering company based in Manchester, announced in August 2016 that it would restart the programme after its intellectual property and rights as well as European and US type certificates were acquired by its parent, Lebanese investment house COPS.

Specifications (Ae 270HP)

See also

References

Notes

Bibliography

External links 

 Specs & Photo at Flugzeuginfo.net

2000s Czech civil utility aircraft
Single-engined tractor aircraft
Ae 270
Aircraft first flown in 2000
Single-engined turboprop aircraft